Christoph Zerbst (born 16 December 1963 in Salzburg) is an Austrian rower.

References 
 
 

1963 births
Living people
Austrian male rowers
Sportspeople from Salzburg
Olympic rowers of Austria
Rowers at the 1992 Summer Olympics
Rowers at the 1996 Summer Olympics
Olympic silver medalists for Austria
Olympic medalists in rowing
World Rowing Championships medalists for Austria
Medalists at the 1992 Summer Olympics